Joonas Kasperi Könttä (born 13 December 1989 in Lieksa) is a Finnish politician currently serving since 2019 in the Parliament of Finland for the Centre Party at the Central Finland constituency. He received his Masters of social sciences from the University of Jyväskylä in 2014. Prior to becoming a member of parliament, he worked for the Ministry for Foreign Affairs, the  Ministry of Education and Culture, and the European Parliament.

References

1989 births
Living people
People from Lieksa
Centre Party (Finland) politicians
Members of the Parliament of Finland (2019–23)